Rachel Getting Married is a 2008 American drama film directed by Jonathan Demme, and starring Anne Hathaway, Rosemarie DeWitt, Bill Irwin, and Debra Winger. The film premiered at the 65th Venice International Film Festival on September 3, 2008, opened in Canada's Toronto International Film Festival on September 6 and released in the U.S. to select theaters on October 3. Hathaway received an Oscar nomination for Best Actress for her performance in the film.

Plot
Kym Buchman is released from rehab for a few days to attend her older sister Rachel's wedding at their childhood home. While friends and family prepare for the festivities, Kym struggles to reintegrate with them, as her history of substance abuse has made her the black sheep of the family.

Despite Kym's nine months of sobriety, her father Paul is uncomfortable with her driving, leading her to bike to a mandated drug test and Narcotics Anonymous meeting. She returns home and is introduced to Rachel's fiancé Sidney and his best man Kieran. Recognizing each other from the meeting, Kym and Kieran have sex, and he reveals that Rachel's best friend Emma will be her maid of honor. Kym confronts her sister, and it becomes clear that Kym's self-destructive behavior has caused a deep rift between them.

Rachel resents the attention her sister is drawing away from the wedding, exacerbated by Kym's behavior at the rehearsal dinner: amid toasts from friends and family, Kym awkwardly jokes about her addiction and "makes amends" with Rachel and others in the gathering for her past actions, as part of her twelve-step program. Later Rachel, angry at what she thinks is Kym's insincere and inappropriate "amends," erupts at Kym and the two engage in an intense argument, which Rachel ends by announcing she is pregnant, to the delight of everyone but Kym.

A disagreement between Sidney and Paul about loading the dishwasher turns into a friendly competition, which is cut short when Paul finds a plate that belonged to his late son Ethan, Rachel and Kym's younger brother. At another NA meeting, Kym reveals that she was responsible for Ethan's death: as a teen, an intoxicated Kym was driving Ethan home, but lost control of the car and drove into a lake, where he drowned.

The day before the wedding, the bridal party visits a salon, where Kym is approached by a man she met at rehab years ago. He thanks her for having inspired him with her stories of overcoming trauma; overhearing this and realizing these stories were lies, Rachel storms out, angry that Kym would lie about having been molested by an uncle or tending to an anorexic sister.

Tensions flare between the sisters when Rachel tells the family that Kym was untruthful during her treatment, and that she has never forgiven Kym for their brother's death. Kym acknowledges that any amount of progress she makes may never make her worthy of forgiveness and drives off in her father's car. She goes to Abby, her and Rachel's mother, but her attempt to find closure backfires; Abby refuses to take responsibility for leaving Kym with Ethan when she knew her daughter was an addict, culminating in a physical altercation.

Distraught, Kym crashes the car in what may have been an attempted suicide, but survives. The morning of the wedding, she is woken in the car by police and passes a field sobriety test, then is driven home and makes her way to Rachel's room. Seeing Kym's bruised face, Rachel tenderly bathes and dresses her sister, discovering Kym's tattoo of a rose with "Ethan" tattooed beneath it.

Amid a festive Indian theme, Rachel and Sidney are wed. Kym is the maid of honor and is overcome with emotion as the couple exchange their vows. She tries to enjoy herself throughout the reception, but continues to feel alienated, and plagued by her dispute with Abby, who leaves early despite Rachel's effort to bring them together. The next morning, as Kym returns to rehab, Rachel runs out of the house to hug her.

Cast

Production
The screenplay was written by Jenny Lumet, the daughter of director Sidney Lumet and granddaughter of Lena Horne. Lumet, a junior high school drama teacher, had written four earlier screenplays, but this was the first to be produced. The film was directed by Jonathan Demme, and was shot in Stamford, Connecticut in a naturalistic style. The working title for the film was originally Dancing with Shiva.

Sidney Lumet himself approached Demme about his daughter Jenny's script. Demme has commented that he loved Jenny's flagrant disregard for the rules of formula, her lack of concern for making her characters likable in the conventional sense, and for what he considered to be her bold approach to truth, pain, and humor.

Filming took 33 days and occurred in late 2007.

Casting
Demme had wanted to work with Anne Hathaway ever since he spotted her in a crowd at a screening five years earlier. He immediately took her in consideration for the lead role. Hathaway later said of her first reading Lumet's script: "I was in my old apartment in the West Village Manhattan, just pacing back and forth between the kitchen table and the couch. I somehow wound up on the floor sobbing by the last page."

Rosemarie DeWitt was considered by the film's casting directors. Demme and the rest of the crew were impressed and immediately wanted her to play Rachel. Bill Irwin is a personal friend of Demme's.

Tunde Adebimpe's role, Sidney, was originally offered to American film director Paul Thomas Anderson while he was working on the post-production of the movie There Will Be Blood.

Demme was concerned about Debra Winger's interest in doing the film, but he pumped up his courage to ask her because they had met several times before at the Jacob Burns Center, a film center close to their homes. Winger later accepted the role of Abby.

Music
The music-loving director Demme invited musicians to compose the score live on set, to support the film's storyline.

"For the longest time," Demme has said, "I've had this desire to provide the musical dimension of a movie without traditionally scored music. I thought: wait a minute; in the script, Paul [father of the bride] is a music-industry bigwig, Sidney's a record producer, many of his friends will be gifted musicians, so of course there would be non-stop music at this gathering. We have music playing live throughout the weekend, but always in the next room, out on the porch or in the garden."

Throughout the unconventional filming and loosely staged scenes, a New York–based Middle Eastern ensemble, including Palestinian musician Zafer Tawil, and Iraqi Amir ElSaffar, who played the score of Demme's documentary Man from Plains, compose the score on set. Always present at the filming, the musicians had the freedom—and were encouraged—to play whenever they were inspired to, and to ignore the camera.

According to Demme on the DVD, during filming of a dramatic scene, Hathaway complained about the music interfering with the mood, to which Demme responded, "Tell her to do something about it!" Hathaway, in that scene, responded by improvising the line, "Can you tell them to knock it off?!" to which another actor not heavily involved in the scene went off-screen and told the band to stop.

Well-known actors mingle anonymously on-screen with musicians, artists, and dancers. Among them are the New Orleanian saxophonist Donald Harrison Jr., and the Brooklyn-based TV on the Radio's lead singer Tunde Adebimpe.

Singer-songwriter Robyn Hitchcock plays a wedding guest. At the ceremony Hitchcock, at the request of his old friend Demme, performs the song "America" from his 1982 album Groovy Decay. He also plays "Up To Our Nex." written for the movie. "It's my micro-encapsulation of the movie. The song is trying to be a voice in Kym's head." Filmed in one take at the wedding party, he is spontaneously joined by the hip-hop star Fab 5 Freddy, and the dancehall singers Sister Carol, ElSaffar and Tawil.

Hitchcock recalled,

For Demme, it was about creating evocative music in the moment.

Reception

Critical response
The film received critical acclaim and appeared on many "Best Film of 2008" lists. On Rotten Tomatoes, it has an approval rating of 84% based on 201 reviews, with an average rating of 7.50/10. The website's critical consensus reads, "Rachel Getting Married is an engrossing tale of family angst, highlighted by Anne Hathaway's powerful performance and director Jonathan Demme's return to form." On Metacritic, the film has a score of 82 out of 100 based on 36 reviews, indicating "universal acclaim.".

Michael Phillips of the Chicago Tribune called the film "a triumph of ambience," and applauded the acting, declaring that "Hathaway, DeWitt, Irwin and especially Winger are working at a very high level" in the film. Roger Ebert's four-star rating added, "apart from the story, which is interesting enough, 'Rachel Getting Married' is like the theme music for an evolving new age." Other critics praised Jonathan Demme. Andrew Sarris noted in the New York Observer "his career of cinematic good works" and Owen Gleiberman of Entertainment Weekly observed "a fight scene that's as raw as Ingmar Bergman and as operatic as Mildred Pierce"... and "Demme's finest work since The Silence of the Lambs.

Peter Travers of Rolling Stone noted that Rachel Getting Married is "a home run ... [it goes] deep into the joy and pain of being human." A.O. Scott of The New York Times said that the film "has an undeniable and authentic vitality, an exuberance of spirit, that feels welcome and rare".

Many reviewers praised the film for its organic feel; Salon reviewer Stephanie Zacharek noted that "with 'Rachel Getting Married,' Demme has once again scaled back, making a picture that has some of the ease and warmth of his earlier movies, although it also feels stripped down and direct in a way that's new for Demme." USA Today proclaimed: "After a foray in documentary films, director Jonathan Demme has returned to narrative storytelling, assuming a decidedly cinéma vérité style that has echoes of Robert Altman. The film's greatest asset is the sense of cringing realism in portraying dinner parties and interpersonal encounters that can throw family members off-kilter." The Los Angeles Times noted:

Anne Hathaway won raves for her work as Kym. USA Today found her wonderful in the role and wrote "Her nervous laughter, edginess and quick temper blend convincingly with her need for attention and vulnerability." Newsweek commented: "Kym is a major pain in the ass, and Hathaway's raw, spiky performance makes no attempt to ingratiate. Yet she makes Kym's inner torment so palpable you can't help but feel for her, however insufferable she may be. It's a terrific performance ...". Empire felt that "Kym is a peach of a role—she sleeps with the best man, fights with the maid of honor, quips, 'You're so thin, it's like you're Asian'—and Hathaway squeezes it for all the juice it's worth, making this raw-nerved, narcissistic Tasmanian Devil not just believable, but somehow likable."

Beyond general analysis, film scholars have also approached the film as a critical commentary on East Coast liberalism in Contemporary Cinema and Neoliberal Ideology.

Top ten lists
The film appeared on many critics' top ten lists of the best films of 2008.

 1st: David Edelstein, New York
 1st: Ed Gonzalez, Slant Magazine
 1st: Keith Phipps, The A.V. Club
 1st: Nathan Rabin, The A.V. Club
 1st: Scott Tobias, The A.V. Club
 2nd: David Denby, The New Yorker
 2nd: Nell Minow, The Movie Mom
 3rd: Owen Gleiberman, Entertainment Weekly
 3rd: Rick Groen, The Globe and Mail
 4th: Elizabeth Weitzman, Daily News
 4th: Shawn Levy, The Oregonian
 5th: Kimberly Jones, The Austin Chronicle

 6th: Kenneth Turan, Los Angeles Times
 6th: Robert Mondello, NPR
 7th: Carrie Rickey, The Philadelphia Inquirer
 7th: Michael Sragow, The Baltimore Sun
 7th: Noel Murray, The A.V. Club
 7th: Ty Burr, The Boston Globe
 8th: Ann Hornaday, The Washington Post
 8th: Rene Rodriguez, Miami Herald
 9th: A. O. Scott, The New York Times
 9th: Kyle Smith, New York Post
 9th: Peter Travers, Rolling Stone
 Top 20: Roger Ebert, Chicago Sun-Times (Ebert gave an alphabetically listed top 20)

Accolades

References

External links
 
 
 
 
 

2008 films
2008 comedy-drama films
2008 independent films
American black comedy films
American comedy-drama films
American independent films
2000s English-language films
Films about drugs
Films about dysfunctional families
Films about weddings in the United States
Films directed by Jonathan Demme
Films produced by Marc E. Platt
Films set in Connecticut
Films shot in Connecticut
Fratricide in fiction
Sony Pictures Classics films
2008 black comedy films
Films about sisters
2000s American films